Bradley Klahn and Adil Shamasdin were the defending champions, but chose not to compete this year.

Seeds

Draw

References
 Main Draw
 Qualifying Draw

Tiburon Challenger - Doubles
2015 Doubles